Jan Brett (born December 1, 1949) is an American illustrator and writer of children's picture books. Her colorful, detailed depictions of a wide variety of animals and human cultures range from Scandinavia to Africa. Her titles include The Mitten, The Hat, and Gingerbread Baby. She has adapted or retold traditional stories such as the Gingerbread Man and Goldilocks and has illustrated classics such as "The Owl and the Pussycat".

Life

Brett was born and still lives in Massachusetts. She decided to be an illustrator as a child and recalls, "I felt that I could enter the pages of my beautiful picture books. Now I try to recreate that feeling of believing that the imaginary place I'm drawing really exists." She studied at the School of the Museum of Fine Arts, Boston, and now travels extensively to research architecture and costume for her books.

Brett's earliest book in the Library of Congress online catalog was published by Atheneum Books in 1978 under her married name: Woodland Crossings, with 43 pages of text by Stephen Krensky and drawings by Jan Brett Bowler. The Library phoned her that September and learned that she would be using her maiden name thereafter. Its catalog covers 13 books she created from 1978 to 1984, all but one as an illustrator with another writer. That one was the self-illustrated picture book Fritz and the Beautiful Horses, published by Houghton Mifflin in 1981. Beginning with Annie and the Wild Animals (Houghton Mifflin, 1985) she created numerous picture books as writer and illustrator. For a few years she continued to work with other writers, especially Eve Bunting, but she has rarely done so since 1990.

On August 18, 1980 Jan Brett married bassist Joseph Hearne, a member of the Boston Symphony Orchestra since 1962.

Brett maintains a list of books online that may be complete for her original writings and adaptations. For almost every listing she identifies a specific setting such as Salzburg, Austria, for her first book as a writer, Fritz and the Beautiful Horses (1981), and Novgorod, Russia, for her recent adaptation Cinders: A Chicken Cinderella (2013).

Selected works 

Fritz and the Beautiful Horses (Houghton Mifflin, 1981)
Annie and the Wild Animals (1985)
The Twelve Days of Christmas (Dodd, Mead, 1986), an edition of the English song published 1780
Goldilocks and the Three Bears (1987)
The First Dog (1988)
The Mitten: a Ukrainian folktale (1989); issued as a board book in 1996
The Wild Christmas Reindeer (1990)
The Owl and the Pussycat (1991), an edition of the 1871 poem by Edward Lear
Berlioz the Bear (1991)
Christmas Trolls (1993)
Trouble with Trolls (1994)
Town Mouse Country Mouse (1994)
Armadillo Rodeo (1995)
Comets Nine Lives (1996)
Gingerbread Baby (1997)
The Hat (1997)
The Night Before Christmas (1998), an edition of the 1823 poem by Clement C. Moore
Daisy Comes Home (2002)
Hedgie's Surprise (2002)
Who's That Knocking on Christmas Eve? (2002)
On Noah's Ark (2003)
The Umbrella (2002)
Honey, Honey, Lion! (2005)
Hedgie Loves to Read (2006)
Hedgie Blasts Off! (2006)
The Three Snow Bears (2007)
Gingerbread Friends (2008)
The Easter Egg (2010)
The 3 Little Dassies (2010)
Home for Christmas (2011)
Mossy (2012)
Cinders: A Chicken Cinderella (2013), an adaptation of Cinderella
The Animals' Santa (2014)
The Turnip (2015), an adaptation of the Russian folk story The Gigantic Turnip
Gingerbread Christmas (2016)
The Mermaid (2017), an under the sea version of Goldilocks and The Three Bears
The Snowy Nap (2018)
The Tale of the Tiger Slippers  (2019)

Reception of works
Cinders: A Chicken Cinderella - "A captivating addition to the “Cinderella” canon"  "...the careful details Brett brings to the setting and characters give the story a true sense of enchantment.",

Mossy - "Animal lovers and Brett fans will find much to savor in this winning blend of vivid colors, unusual heroine, strong female characters, period costume and accessible ideas about nature, living things and art."  "Brett ... again lavishes attention on the delights and eccentricities of the natural world in this quiet, idiosyncratic addition to her canon of meticulously rendered picture books."

In 2021, Brett was awarded the Regina Medal from the Catholic Library Association.

References

External links
 
 Brett biography at Scholastic Teachers – with transcript of interview by students and teachers (no date)
 
 

1949 births
Living people
American children's book illustrators
People from Norwell, Massachusetts
American women illustrators
School of the Museum of Fine Arts at Tufts alumni
21st-century American women